Victor Eugene Carroll (November 19, 1912 – July 6, 1986) was an American football offensive lineman in the National Football League (NFL) for the Boston/Washington Redskins and the New York Giants.  He played college football at the University of Nevada-Reno.

External links
 

1912 births
1986 deaths
American football offensive linemen
Boston Redskins players
Nevada Wolf Pack football players
New York Giants players
People from the San Gabriel Valley
Washington Redskins players
Sportspeople from Mission Viejo, California
Sportspeople from Alhambra, California
Players of American football from California